James Burrough may refer to:

Sir James Burrough (architect) (1691–1764), English amateur architect
Sir James Burrough (judge) (1749–1837), British judge